Beijing is a town in Dahua Yao Autonomous County, Hechi, in Guangxi, China. , it administers Nase Community and the following nine villages:
Jiangdong Village
Liuhua Village
Handa Village
Pingfang Village
Jingtun Village
Banlan Village
Nongguan Village
Anlan Village
Kekao Village

References

Towns of Hechi
Dahua Yao Autonomous County